Charles Alexander Lockhart Robertson (4 April 1825 – 18 May 1897), best known as C. Lockhart Robertson, was a Scottish asylum doctor and spiritualist.

He was born in Edinburgh, the son of John Argyll Robertson, President of the Royal College of Surgeons of Edinburgh. His younger brother, Douglas Argyll Robertson, became a distinguished ophthalmic surgeon. He studied Medicine at Caius College, Cambridge where he earned his M.D. in 1856. Lockhart Robertson worked as the superintendent of  Sussex County Asylum at Haywards Heath from 1859 to 1870, and in 1860 he also served as Linacre demonstrator of Anatomy at Oxford University. In 1870, he was appointed Lord Chancellor's medical visitor and he held this position till 1896. He was the honorary secretary of the Medico-Psychological Association and edited the Journal of Mental Science. Lockhart Robertson's translation of Griesinger's Mental Pathology (undertaken in conjunction with James Rutherford) was a valuable addition to the professional literature. Robertson did not publish widely but his achievements with enlightened asylum administration attracted professional admiration across Europe.

Lockhart Robertson, originally a skeptic in the 1850s, became a convinced spiritualist in 1860 after attending a séance with the medium Daniel Dunglas Home. He was a founding member of the Society for Psychical Research. He died at Exmouth.

Publications

A Descriptive Notice of the Sussex Lunatic Asylum, Haywards Heath  (1859)
A Case of Homicidal Mania, Without Disorder of the Intellect (1860)
The Care and Treatment of the Insane Poor (1867)

References

1825 births
1897 deaths
Parapsychologists
Medical doctors from Edinburgh
Scottish psychiatrists
Scottish spiritualists
Heads of psychiatric hospitals